Precision Drill Squad (PDS) is a form of exhibition drill practised in Singapore which involves the execution of rifle drills in complex series of movements with great co-ordination and precision. The natures of these drills exhibit a plethora of diversity; they may be sharp and quick, graceful and flowing, or include a wide variety of tossing and spinning techniques. During performances, performers move in unison through choreographed patterns with the rifles moving under their control, always synchronised with the rhythm of the music. Drills are executed without command and the only sound that is heard is the snap and pop of the rifles on every step, in perfect synchronisation and with precision.

PDS is mainly performed and executed by the Singapore Armed Forces Military Police Command and a few privileged National Cadet Corps units, National Police Cadet Corps units and National Civil Defence Cadet Corps units in Singapore, usually at school events, inter-unit competitions or open houses.

Origin
PDS is derived from rifle exhibition drill, which originated from United States' various drill teams such as the Marine Corps Silent Drill Platoon and have since spread to many other countries such as Norway, Australia, Slovenia and Taiwan. PDS is identical to the Silent Precision Drill Squad (SPDS) of the SAFMPC.

Introduced in 1984, SPDS is performed in the Changing of Guard Ceremony at the gates of the Istana on the first Sunday of every month and in major events like Singapore National Day Parades and Chingay Processions, and was adopted in its present form by the National Cadet Corps, where it is performed by NCC school units which have adopted PDS in their training syllabus by 1999, with an initial participation of only about 20 school units. Due to its rarity and difficulty, the element of PDS in NCC units and NPCC units is considered a great privilege.

Equipment

Rifles

PDS is most commonly executed with either the 4 kg (8.8 lbs) Lee–Enfield Mk IV rifle, or the many variations of the Mk IV fiberglass or wooden replica rifles, which are 105.5 cm long, 3.2 cm thick at the muzzle, and weigh from 1.6 kg to 5.0 kg. Variations include the Performance rifle or the heavier Competition rifle. The dummy rifles are black by default, but come in various colours and designs to match the nature of the performance. Some versions include metal bases, tips or other additions to enhance the 'feel' of the performance. M-16 rifles are also sometimes used, and on occasion, with bayonets fixed.

Attire

The official attire for PDS stipulated by HQ NCC is the Smart No. 4 uniform for all cadets, although air or sea units are permitted to wear their respective No. 3 uniforms without badges. Since male cadets in Land units only receive their No.3 uniform upon graduation from the Cadet Officer Course, No. 3 uniforms are sometimes borrowed for the sake of performances. In this case, the No. 3 uniform is worn with white stable belts, white polyester laces and combat boots with trousers tucked into garters, in imitation of the Military Police No. 3 Uniform. Modified versions of the attire can be worn to increase the aesthetic appeal of the performance, notable examples being Half No. 4 with Jockey Cap, Half No. 3, No. 3 with Brassards labelled "PDS", "Precision Drill" or with ranks embroidered, also in imitation of the SAF Military Police No. 3 Uniform. White gloves can also be worn for performances.

Participating schools
These are the NCC units that are known to practise Precision Drill:

Centre of Excellence
The NCC PDS Centre of Excellence was set up to allow NCC units that wish to introduce Precision Drill as part of their training curriculum but do not have the necessary expertise may send their specialists and cadet officers for training at the centre.
As a Centre of Excellence, the unit's Centre of Excellence Council is given the autonomous right to train key stakeholders of NCC units of other schools and issue them Basic PDS badges and patches on their course completion, the first unit awarded the title being Hwa Chong Institution in 2007.

List of Training Centers

To qualify as PDS training centre, the NCC school unit must, on a regular and yearly basis, conduct PDS training for different NCC units in their respective District.

Hwa Chong Institution

Fairfield Methodist School (Secondary)

Anglican High School

Deyi Secondary School

Catholic High School

The PDS Center of Excellence was awarded by the Ministry of Education to Hwa Chong Institution in 2007. To qualify for the Center of Excellence, the unit must be endorsed by Ministry of Education and the National Cadet Corps HQ.

NCC PDS Committee
The NCC PDS Committee was formed on 25 May 2012 by a group of PDS Auxiliary Instructors, intended to improve and maintain the standard and prestige of PDS in the National Cadet Corps. The PDS Committee assists HQ NCC in running the Basic PDS Certification and any other PDS-related HQ Courses.

Training courses

Basic Course and Certification
Cadets from NCC PDS units have the opportunity to attend the Basic PDS course, held at the NCC campus at Amoy Quee Camp or the five NCC PDS Training Centres quad-annually. During the 3-day course cadets are instructed in the execution of basic PDS drills, more commonly referred to as the basic 21 and the conduct of PDS Rifle Physical Training (PT). Cadets are tested based on two categories, Drill Execution and Presentation. Upon passing of the test, cadets will attain the Basic PDS badge, Basic PDS patch and a certificate. Units that include Basic PDS in their training syllabus may skip the course entirely and send their cadets for Basic PDS certification directly.

Auxiliary Instructor Course
Upon passing of a stringent selection test, outstanding cadets will have the privilege of attending the PDS Auxiliary Instructor Course. Cadets may enroll in the Enhanced PDS Auxiliary Instructor Course, held in HQ NCC (Amoy Quee Camp) and conducted by SPDS instructors from the SAF Military Police Command SPDS unit. The 5-day course will cover 7 advanced arm drills, basic choreography and train participants on the conduct of PDS as an instructor and cadets will be tested based on MOI (Method-of-Instruction), which is how the cadets teach the drills, and execution of the 7 Drills. Upon graduation from the course, these cadets are qualified to conduct PDS trainings in their respective school units, as well as attaining the PDS AI badge, the PDS AI patch and a certificate.

Inter-unit competition
The inaugural 1st NCC Silent Precision Drill Squad Competition was held on 12 June 2010, and has since been held annually at HQ NCC in Amoy Quee Camp. The Competition gives the various school units the opportunity to present their choreographing skill and drill standard, giving recognition to the best drill squads. Every year, the Challenge Trophy, the Golden Rifle, is entrusted to the winning team for a year. Should any team emerge as champions for three consecutive years, the Golden Rifle is theirs to keep. Hwa Chong Institution and Pasir Ris Crest Secondary School (Girls) remain as the only units to have achieved this.

The Competition includes an inspection of appearance and bearing and an evaluation of the squad's performance.

The following is the scoring criteria for the PDS competition:

Penalties
A deduction of 5 points will be made for every cadet under the minimum squad size of 9, 2 points for boundary violations during the performance, 2 and 3 points respectively for slipping or dropping of rifles, and 1 point for every second the performance fails to meet the criteria of being restricted within 4 to 6 minutes in length.

List of champions

Types of performance

PDS performances can be generally classified under two major types, Stage Performances and Field Performances.

Stage performances
PDS Stage performances are smaller-scaled performances, generally with 10–20 performers on stage. Unlike the larger-scaled Field Performances, stage performances usually include more spectacular, advanced PDS drills. Stage performances have also been known to include special lighting effects into its performances.

Field performances

PDS Field performances are the largest-scaled performances, generally with 28–40 performers on a grass field or courtyard. Unlike the smaller-scaled Stage Performances, Field Performances can be displayed to a significantly much larger crowd of spectators. Pyrotechnic devices such as sparks or fireworks could be included in its performances.

Drill syllabus
PDS drills can be classified into the Basic 21 (Marching Arm Drills, Salute Arm Drills, Dressing Arm Drills, Performance Arm Drills) and the Advanced 7. The Advanced 7 are taught during the PDS Auxiliary Instructor course. All drills are done in counts of 8 as a way to help choreographers synchronize with accompanying music.

The list of advanced drills is non-exhaustive, given the infinite possibility of drills that can be invented or modified for the purpose of performances, and many reflect increasing influence from the Rifle Exhibition Drill in the United States.

Basic 21 Drills

Slope and Order Drills
 Vertical Slope Arm (4+1)
 Vertical Order Arm (4+1)
 Diagonal Slope Arm (6+1)
 Diagonal Order Arm (4+1)

Marching Arm Drills
 Slapping Arm (12+1)
 Sungfoo Arm (14+1)
 Double Right Turning Arm (18+1)
 Slow Markal Arm (16+1)

Salute Arm Drills
 11-Step Salute (10+1)
 Butt Salute (8+1)
 Marine Salute (6+1)

Dressing Arm Drills
 Popeye Arm (12+1)
 Balancing Arm (16+1)
 Pungfoo Arm (10+1)
 Modified Seagull Arm (Chingay Seagull Arm) (14+1)
 Momo Arm (10+1)

Performance Arm Drills
 Dragon Arm (26+1)
 Mortar Arm (18+1)
 Pipa Arm (16+1)
 Sea Games Arm (14+1)
 Tamil Arm (12+1)

Outside of the Basic 21, there are some drills which have been removed from the syllabus but continue to be used in performances, both in their original as well as modified forms.
Some examples include:
 Original Momo Arm
 Original Double Right Turning Arm
 Original Dragon Toss Arm
 Volvo Order Arm
 Volvo Slope Arm
 Right Turning Arm

Advanced Drills

AI 7 Drills
 Impact Arm (12+1)
 Ramesh Arm (18+1)
 Tapping Arm (18+1)
 Flipper Arm (22+1)
 Dolphin Arm (20+1)
 Champagne Arm (20+1)
 Original Seagull Arm (30+1)

Created Drills
 Flying Fish Arm
 T3H
 Tick Tocks

Fundamental Advanced Techniques
 Rotation/One hand spin(Right/Left/Double Handed)
 Tornado Toss
 Vincent
 Foot stop

Tosses
 Jumbo (Double/Triple/Quad/Quint)
 AXP (Double/Triple/Quad/Quint)
 Saturn Exchange (Front/Back)
 Jesus Toss 
 Taiwanese Toss
 Continuum Toss

Flow Components
 Rising Sun (Variant 1/2/3)
 Exit (Single/Double/Triple)
 Fireknife (Single/Double)
 Crossplane
 Continuum
 Eclipse
 Power Stop/Downtown
 Hawaiian Punch
 Neck Wrap

Hooks
 J-Hook (Single/Double/Triple)
 OTH J-Hook
M-Hook
AR Hook

Over The Head (OTH) Techniques
 Helicopter
 Heli Toss
 Palm Spin

Ninjas
 Front Ninja
 Side Ninja
 Back Ninja

Wrist Techniques
 Flailing Rifle
 Hell's Whip
 Lightsaber
 Jerk Spin Off

Crossplanes
 Centino Crossplane
 Tomahawk Crossplane 
 The Illinois Crew (TIC) Crossplane

Rolls
 Side Palm Roll
 Around The Neck Roll

Death (360° Turn) Techniques
 Flying Floridian
 Flying Hawaiian 
 Death Triple
 Death Continuum 
 Cointoss 
 180° Continuum Cointoss
 J-Hook Death
 Palm Toss Death

Performance videos
Many of the NCC units have filmed their exhilarating performances and are available for free viewing on YouTube under the channels 'National Cadet Corps', 'SgPDS(NCC)', 'HQ National Cadet Corps' and "NCC PDS". Within these channels viewers can learn the basic 21 PDS drills used by these school teams.

References
Sin, Tino (2006) Pride, Discipline, Honour SAF Provost Media Department, Ministry of Defence, Singapore
Estrop, Peter (2006) Our Army: Customs and Traditions, Ministry of Defence, Singapore

External links
NCC Supernumeraries Website

Military education and training in Singapore